Zakiabad or Zekiabad may refer to:
 Zakiabad, Alborz
 Zakiabad, Mazandaran